Marie Louise Corridon Mortell (February 5, 1930 – May 26, 2010) was an American competition swimmer and Olympic champion.

Corridon was born in Washington, D.C., but moved with her family to Norwalk, Connecticut, when her father started his medical practice there.  She attended Sacred Heart Academy in Stamford, Connecticut.  She learned to swim at the age of 5, and demonstrated a natural ability as a swimmer.  She was the Amateur Athletic Union (AAU) national champion in the 100-yard freestyle in 1948, and set a new U.S. record in the event.  She won the 100-yard freestyle national championship again in 1950.

Corridon competed at the 1948 Summer Olympics in London, where she won a gold medal as the lead-off swimmer of the first-place U.S. team in the women's 4×100-meter freestyle relay. Corridon, together with her teammates Thelma Kalama, Brenda Helser and Ann Curtis, set a new Olympic record in the event final.  Individually, she also competed in the women's 100-meter freestyle, but did not advance to the final. After the Olympics, Corridon attended Marymount Manhattan College.  She also worked for Avery Brundage, the long-time head of the United States Olympic Committee.

Personal life
Corridon married William Edward Mortell, and together they had seven children. She died in Norwalk, Connecticut on May 26, 2010, aged 80.

See also
 List of Olympic medalists in swimming (women)

References

External links
 

1930 births
2010 deaths
American female freestyle swimmers
Olympic gold medalists for the United States in swimming
Sportspeople from Norwalk, Connecticut
Swimmers at the 1948 Summer Olympics
Medalists at the 1948 Summer Olympics
21st-century American women